Allertonshire or Allerton was a wapentake and liberty in the North Riding of Yorkshire, England.

Northallerton, current name of Allerton, was historically associated with the Bishopric of Durham, being an ecclesiastical peculiar and exclave until the 19th century. 

The shires central location in the North Riding (1889-1974) and its successor North Yorkshire (1974-present) allowed the town to become the administrative centre for both counties.

The contiguous part of the wapentake included the ancient parishes of:
Birkby
Kirby Sigston
Leake
Northallerton
Osmotherley
North Otterington
Thornton-le-Street

The wapentake also included exclaves of:
the extra parochial area of Hutton Conyers
the parish of West Rounton
the parish of Sessay
the Yorkshire part of the parish of Sockburn (townships of Girsby and Over Dinsdale)

The wapentake also included part of the parish of Kirklington, including the vill of Howgrave.

See also 
 Hallamshire
 Howdenshire
 Hullshire
 Winchcombeshire

References

Wapentakes of the North Riding of Yorkshire
Former counties of England